The Key West Street Car Company was incorporated by Florida state law chapter 3658, approved February 12, 1885, to establish a street railroad for public transportation in Key West, Florida.

The law stated the company had a right "to construct and operate a line of railway or railroads on any or all the streets in the city of Key West, as per charter granted by the Board of Aldermen of said city of Key West, Florida, and the right to extend or build said road upon any and all the avenues, streets or roads leading into said city of Key West, and upon all roads on the island of Key West; and said company shall further have the right to operate said line or lines of railroad, or any of them, with steam or horse power."

It was established as owned by Walter C. Maloney, Edward H. Gato, Lewis W. Pierce, George G. Watson, John White, and Charles B. Pendleton.

See also
 List of Florida street railroads

References

External links
A short summary of the line
List of railroads incorporated in Florida; Bonds (Hometown Currency Virtual Museum)

Defunct Florida railroads
Florida street railroads
Defunct public transport operators in the United States
1885 establishments in Florida
History of Key West, Florida